Total loss   is a 2000 Dutch drama film directed by Dana Nechushtan.

Cast
Hans Bakker	... 	Bodyguard
Luc Boyer	... 	Father Hekking
Tijn Docter	... 	Co-assistant
Danny de Kok	... 	Fietser
Ricky Koole	... 	Muis
Mike Libanon	... 	Armin
Elvira Out	... 	Woman at boat
Roef Ragas	... 	Duco van Poelgeest
Franky Ribbens	... 	Jeroen Hekking
Harriet Stroet	... 	Nurse
Boris van der Ham	... 	Co-assistant
Gerrie van der Klei	... 	Junkfrau
Yorick van Wageningen	... 	Reinier Kloprogge

External links 
 

Dutch drama films
2000 films
2000s Dutch-language films
2000 drama films
Films shot in Cologne